Omorgus borgognoi is a species of hide beetle in the subfamily Omorginae and subgenus Afromorgus.

References

borgognoi
Beetles described in 1902